Wanquan Township is a township under the administration of Wanrong County, Shanxi, China. , it has 15 villages under its administration.

References 

Township-level divisions of Shanxi
Wanrong County